The 1952 UC Santa Barbara Gauchos football team represented Santa Barbara College during the 1952 college football season.

Santa Barbara competed in the California Collegiate Athletic Association (CCAA). The team was led by head coach Stan Williamson in the first year of his second tenure as head coach. He had coached the team from 1941 to 1948, before taking a sabbatical and serving in the Navy. While in the Navy, Williamson coached the San Diego Naval Air Station football team, including leading the team to the naval championship in 1951. The Gauchos played home games at La Playa Stadium in Santa Barbara, California. They finished the season with a record of eight wins and two losses (8–2, 3–1 CCAA).

Schedule

Notes

References

Santa Barbara
UC Santa Barbara Gauchos football seasons
Santa Barbara Gauchos football